Online music education is a recent development in the field of music education consisting of the application of new technologies associated with distance learning and online education for the purpose of teaching and learning music in an online environment mediated by computers and the internet.

The origins of online music education may be traced to the use of technologies to supplement face-to-face learning in traditional classroom settings, however in recent years it has expanded to include the offering of entire degree programs – even doctoral degrees – online.  

The rise of technologies leading to the development of online music education is well documented, and  such studies have become particularly popular in the United States in recent years (Schlager, 2008; Webster, 2007). Salavuo (2006) has examined the recent popularization of informal engagement with music technology in online social networks, which may embody a form of informal community music education. The potential of online music education to create positive change in terms of professional development has been noted by various scholars (Hebert, 2008; Sherbon & Kish, 2005); However, concerns have also been raised regarding the absence of a sufficient research base concerning the effectiveness of online music education (Hebert, 2007; Webster, 2007). It is likely that more studies will be seen in this high-growth area in the coming years.

Institutions offering online music education 
The following is a partial list of North American institutions that offer online degree programs in music education:

Boston University College of Fine Arts
University of Florida College of the Arts
University of Georgia
Rutgers University Mason Gross School of the Arts
Auburn University
Duquesne University Mary Pappert School of Music
Ohio University
University of South Florida
University of Hawaii at Manoa
Kent State University
Stephen F. Austin State University
University of Southern Mississippi
East Carolina University
University of Missouri

The most common degree offered online in this subject area is a Master of Music, although one institution also offers a Doctor of Musical Arts degree. As of mid-2008, one institution - Boston University - has over 800 online graduate students in music education.

The following is a partial list of institutions that offer online courses and masterclasses in music education:

 Lessonface.com is a ed-tech educational community connecting music teachers and students.

 iClassical Academy

See also
Music education
Online education
Distance education
Music technology
Comparison of music education software

Bibliography 
Hebert, David G. "Reflections on Teaching the Aesthetics and Sociology of Music Online." International Review of the Aesthetics and Sociology of Music 39 no. 1 (2008, June).
Hebert, David G. "Five Challenges and Solutions in Online Music Teacher Education." Research and Issues in Music Education 5 (2007).
Salavuo, Miikka. "Open and Informal Online Communities as Forums of Collaborative Musical Activities and Learning." British Journal of Music Education 23 no. 3 (2006), pp. 253-271.
Schlager, Ken. "Distance Learning." Teaching Music 15 no. 6 (2008, June): 36-38.
Sherbon, James W. & Kish, David L. "Distance Learning and the Music Teacher." Music Educators Journal 92 no. 2 (2005): 36-41.
Webster, Peter R. "Computer-Based Technology and Music Teaching and Learning: 2000-2005." In Liora Bresler (Ed.), International Handbook of Research in Arts Education (New York: Springer, 2007): pp.1311-1328.

External links
International Society for Music Education
iClassical Academy

Occupations in music
Sociomusicology